Bresee is a surname. Notable people with the surname include:

Bryan Bresee (born 2001), American football player
Frank Bresee (1929–2018), American radio actor, radio historian, and board game designer
John Bresee (1966–2019), American entrepreneur,  writer, editor, and entrepreneur coach
Phineas F. Bresee (1838–1915), American religious leader and educator
Rebecca Wilson Bresee, American computer animator
Ric Bresee, Canadian politician

See also
Bresee Hall